Sackville School may refer to:

Sackville School, East Grinstead, Mid Sussex, England, a comprehensive school
Sackville School, Hildenborough, Kent, England, an independent school
Sackville High School, Lower Sackville, Nova Scotia, Canada